The women's +52 kg event in bodybuilding at the 2005 World Games in Duisburg was played from 16 to 17 July. The bodybuilding competition took place in TAM Theatre.

Competition format
A total of 12 athletes entered the competition. The best five athletes from round 1 advances to the final rounds. Scores from round 1 doesn't count in final rounds.

Results

References

External links
 Results on IWGA website

Bodybuilding at the 2005 World Games